Clifton Grima is a Maltese lawyer and politician who has served in the Parliament of Malta since 2016. A member of the Labour Party, Grima is also the Minister for Education and Sport.

Political career 
In 2010, Grima graduated from the University of Malta with a Legum Doctor degree. Following this, Grima was elected as the mayor of Msida, serving as mayor from 2009 to 2013. He was later appointed by Joseph Muscat, the prime minister of Malta, to be the CEO of Mount Carmel Hospital.

In the 2013 Maltese general election, Grima, a member of the Labour Party, stood as a candidate for the Parliament of Malta in District 9. Grima was the penultimate candidate to be eliminated, receiving 1,646 votes. In 2016, following the resignation of District 9 incumbent Leo Brincat, Grima won the special election to succeed him in parliament. He was re-elected in the 2017 Maltese general election. During this term, Grima was one of several high-ranking Labour MPs who revolted against Muscat, who was embroiled in a corruption scandal.

In 2017, Grima served as the parliamentary secretary in the Ministry for Education. He held this position until 2020, when he was appointed parliamentary secretary for sport.

On 29 December 2021, Grima was appointed Minister for Education and Sport by Prime Minister Robert Abela following the resignation of Justyne Caruana, who had resigned after an ethics scandal. Immediately after his appointment as minister, The Shift, an investigative newspaper in Malta, revealed that one of Grima's closest supporters, an official for a water polo team, was suspended from his position for levying death threats against an official of the Aquatic Sports Association of Malta. During his time as minister, Grima promoted inclusivity in schools and opposed a proposal for mandatory COVID-19 vaccinations for children. Grima has also advocated for the restructuring of Malta's professional sports system, funding grassroots programs to train children in professional sports rather than to hire foreign athletes.

In the 2022 Maltese general election, Grima switched his constituency to District 10 and won re-election in his new constituency.

References 

Living people
Labour Party (Malta) politicians
Members of the House of Representatives of Malta
21st-century Maltese politicians
Year of birth missing (living people)
Date of birth missing (living people)
Place of birth missing (living people)
Mayors of places in Malta
Education ministers of Malta
University of Malta alumni
People from Msida